The China Association for Science and Technology (CAST) is a mass organization of Chinese scientists and engineers, which is composed of multiple national professional societies and hundreds of branches at various local and international levels. CAST was formed in September 1958 through the merger of the All-China Federation of Natural Science Societies and the All-China Association for Science Popularization. Its stated goal is to act as a link between the science and technology community and the Chinese Communist Party (CCP) and government. CAST is a constituent member of the Chinese People's Political Consultative Conference (CPPCC). Wan Gang is the current president of the national committee of CAST. Zhang Yuzhuo serves as the Chinese Communist Party Committee Secretary for CAST.

Technology transfer 
In December 2003, CAST established the Help Our Motherland through Elite Intellectual Resources from Overseas Program (HOME, also known as "Haizhi") in concert with the Organization Department of the Chinese Communist Party and the Ministry of Human Resources and Social Security. The goal of HOME has been to recruit overseas science and technology talent for technology transfer purposes. Since 2014, CAST has established a series of "offshore entrepreneurial bases" in multiple countries that have been described as a "hub-and-spoke model where a base in China incubates and commercializes innovative ideas sourced from a network of offshore innovation centers in foreign countries."

In the United States, CAST has maintained relations with the similarly-named Chinese Association for Science and Technology (CAST-USA), a non-profit organization established in 1992 with chapters in multiple U.S. states. The China International Culture Exchange Center has been a long-time working partner with CAST for its exchange programs.

Journal
Science & Technology Review was begun in 1980 in the United States and is the official journal of CAST.

See also 

 Thousand Talents Plan
Technology Transfer Center of Zhejiang University
Plan 111

References

External links
 

Members of the International Council for Science
Engineering societies based in China
Technology transfer
Members of the International Science Council
Members of the Chinese People's Political Consultative Conference
Organizations associated with the Chinese Communist Party
United front (China)